Sohini Paul (born 31 December 1986, Kolkata) is a Bengali Indian film actress. She is the daughter of actor-politician Tapas Paul and his wife, Nandini.

Career
A student of Lakshmipat Singhania Academy in 2004 when she was in Class XII, she made her debut in the Anjan Dutt-directed English film Bow Barracks Forever. Here her role was a wild, erudite Anglo-Indian youngster out to break the rules. After that she was cast by Kaushik Ganguly directed Jackpot in 2009. She also acted in Ekti Meye Tamashi, directed  by Salilmoy Ghosh, opposite Jisshu Sengupta.

Filmography
Bow Barracks Forever (2004) - Sally
Jackpot (2009) - Mithu Dutta
Ekti Meye Tamashi (2009)
Autograph (2010) - Ahona Dasgupta
Hum Tum Dushman Dushman (2015)

Television

References

External links

1986 births
Actresses in Bengali cinema
Indian film actresses
Living people
21st-century Indian actresses